The One Country Two Systems Research Institute (OCTS; Chinese:一國兩制研究中心) is a Hong Kong think tank founded in 1990 by a group of pro-Beijing politicians. It is registered in Hong Kong as private non-profit company with limited liability, and has been granted the status of a public interest charitable organisation by the Government of Hong Kong.

History
The group was founded in 1990 and financed by T. K. Ann and Leung Chun-ying. By 1997, it had approximately 30 staff and publishes newspapers and books on a wide range of topics relevant to transitional issues. It was headed by Shiu Sin-por.

In 2012, Executive Director of the Institute Cheung Chi-kong was appointed by Chief Executive Leung Chun-ying to the Executive Council.

See also
 One country, two systems
 List of think tanks in Hong Kong

References

External links 
 

Non-profit organisations based in Hong Kong
Political and economic think tanks based in Hong Kong
Think tanks established in 1990
1990 establishments in Hong Kong